Sports Parade is an Australian television series which aired in 1957. Broadcast on Melbourne station GTV-9, it ran weekly from 7 June 1957 to 23 August 1957. It was a simulcast of a 3KZ radio series. Hosted by Tony Charlton, each episode featured members of a different football club. It aired in a half-hour time-slot. It is not known if the series ever kinescoped.

Other early Australian television series to be based on radio shows included Raising a Husband, Leave it to the Girls, Oxford Show, Swallows Parade and The Pressure Pak Show.

See also

List of Australian television series

References

External links

1957 Australian television series debuts
1957 Australian television series endings
Australian sports television series
English-language television shows
Black-and-white Australian television shows
Australian live television series